Arionoidea is a taxonomic group, superfamily of air-breathing land slugs, shell-less terrestrial pulmonate gastropod mollusks.

Families 
Families within the superfamily Arionoidea include:
 Arionidae
 Anadenidae
 Ariolimacidae
 Binneyidae
 Oopeltidae
 Philomycidae

References

Stylommatophora
Taxa named by John Edward Gray